John Waynflete Carter (10 May 1905 – 18 March 1975) was an English writer, diplomat, bibliographer, book-collector, antiquarian bookseller and vice-president of the Bibliographical Society of London. He was the great-grandson of Canon T. T. Carter.

Biography
After attending Eton College, he studied classics at King's College, Cambridge, where he gained a double first. His 1934 exposé, An Enquiry into the Nature of Certain Nineteenth Century Pamphlets, co-written with Graham Pollard, exposed the forgeries of books and pamphlets by Harry Buxton Forman, an editor of Keats and Shelley, and Thomas J. Wise, one of the world's most prominent book collectors. Forman and Wise's crimes are generally regarded as one of the most notorious literary scandals of the twentieth century. Carter also wrote seminal books on aspects of book-collecting, and served on the board of directors of the influential journal The Book Collector, published by Queen Anne Press, a company managed by James Bond creator Ian Fleming. Carter also edited the prose of the poet A. E. Housman. He was the husband of the writer and curator Ernestine Carter and the brother of the printer Will Carter (1912–2001) of the Rampant Lions Press, at which some of his smaller-scale works were published. He was also a humorist and writer of clerihews, some of which were printed by Will Carter in 1938.

Selected works
ABC for book collectors. 8th ed. edited by Nicolas Barker. New Castle, Del.: Oak Knoll Press; London: British Library, 2004.  (British Library)  (Oak Knoll); a classic, first published in 1952. 
Taste and technique in book-collecting, with an epilogue. Pinner, Middlesex: Private Libraries Association, 1970 (The Sandars Lectures in Bibliography, 1947). 
Binding variants in English publishing: 1820-1900. London: Constable; New York: Ray Long & Richard R. Smith, 1932.
More binding variants. London: Constable, 1938.
Publisher's cloth ... 1820-1900. New York: Bowker; London: Constable, 1935. Reprinted 1970.

References

Bibliography
Dickinson, Donald C., John Carter: the taste & technique of a bookman. Oak Knoll Press, New Castle, Del., 2004. 

1905 births
1975 deaths
People educated at Eton College
Alumni of King's College, Cambridge
English bibliographers
English book and manuscript collectors
English booksellers
20th-century English male writers
20th-century English businesspeople